The 21st Daytime Emmy Awards were held on May 25, 1994.

Winners and nominees

Winners are in bold.

Outstanding Drama Series
All My Children
As the World Turns
Guiding Light
The Young and the Restless

Outstanding Lead Actor
Peter Bergman (Jack Abbott, The Young and the Restless)
Charles Keating (Carl Hutchins, Another World)
Peter Simon (Ed Bauer, Guiding Light)
Robert S. Woods (Bo Buchanan, One Life to Live)
Michael Zaslow (Roger Thorpe, Guiding Light)

Outstanding Lead Actress
Julia Barr (Brooke English, All My Children)
Linda Dano (Felicia Gallant, Another World)
Fiona Hutchison (Jenna Bradshaw, Guiding Light)
Hillary B. Smith (Nora Hanen, One Life to Live)
Kathleen Widdoes (Emma Snyder, As the World Turns)

Outstanding Supporting Actor
Ian Buchanan (James Warwick, The Bold and the Beautiful)
Thom Christopher (Mortimer Bern, One Life to Live)
Justin Deas (Buzz Cooper, Guiding Light)
Patrick Tovatt (Cal Stricklyn, As the World Turns)
Jerry verDorn (Ross Marler, Guiding Light)

Outstanding Supporting Actress
Signy Coleman (Hope Wilson, The Young and the Restless)
Hilary Edson (Eve Guthrie, Guiding Light)
Maureen Garrett (Holly Reade, Guiding Light)
Susan Haskell (Marty Saybrooke, One Life to Live)
Sharon Wyatt (Tiffany Hill, General Hospital)

Outstanding Performer in a Children's Special
Justin Whalin, CBS Schoolbreak Special: Other Mothers

Outstanding Younger Actor
Bryan Buffington (Bill Lewis, Guiding Light)
Scott DeFreitas (Andrew Dixon, As the World Turns)
Roger Howarth (Todd Manning, One Life to Live)
Monti Sharp (David Grant, Guiding Light)
Dondre Whitfield (Terrence Frye, All My Children)

Outstanding Younger Actress
Martha Byrne (Lily Walsh Grimaldi, As the World Turns)
Sarah Michelle Gellar (Kendall Hart, All My Children)
Melissa Hayden (Bridget Reardon, Guiding Light)
Melina Kanakaredes (Eleni Andros, Guiding Light)
Heather Tom (Victoria Newman, The Young and the Restless)

Outstanding Drama Series Writing Team
Another World
Days of Our Lives
One Life to Live
The Young and the Restless

Outstanding Drama Series Directing Team
All My Children
Guiding Light
The Young and the Restless

Outstanding Game Show
Jeopardy! (Merv Griffin Enterprises/KingWorld)
The Price Is Right (Mark Goodson Productions/All American Television/CBS)
Wheel of Fortune (Merv Griffin Enterprises/KingWorld)

Outstanding Game Show Host
Bob Barker (The Price Is Right)
Alex Trebek (Jeopardy!)

Outstanding Writing in a Children's Series
Daryl Busby, and Tom J. Astle (Adventures in Wonderland) 
Norman Stiles, Lou Berger, Molly Boylan, Sara Compton, Judy Freudberg, Tony Geiss, Ian Ellis James, Emily Perl Kingsley, David Korr, Sonia Manzano, Joey Mazzarino, Nancy Sans, Luis Santeiro, Josh Selig, Jon Stone, Cathi Turow, Belinda Ward, and John Weidman (Sesame Street) 
Andrew Gutelle, and Ronnie Krauss (Reading Rainbow)
Fred Rogers (Mister Rogers' Neighborhood)

Outstanding Writing in an Animated Program
Ray Bradbury (The Halloween Tree) 
Michael Reaves, Brynne Stephens, Paul Dini, Laren Bright, Randy Rogel, Martin Pasko, and Alan Burnett (Batman: The Animated Series)
Savage Steve Holland, and Bill Kopp (Eek! The Cat)
Paul Germain, Peter Gaffney, Joe Ansolabehere, Steve Viksten, Rachel Lipman, and Jonathan Greenberg (Rugrats)
 Chris Hubbell, Sam Graham, Diane Dixon, Carol Corwen, Grant Moran, Jim Staahl, Howie Mandel, Jim Fisher, Peter Tilden, and David Castro (Bobby's World)
 John P. McCann, Nicholas Hollander, Tom Minton, Paul Rugg, Deanna Oliver, Tom Ruegger, Sherri Stoner, Randy Rogel, Peter Hastings (Animaniacs)

Outstanding Film Sound Editing
Michael Gollom, Timothy Borquez, Michael Geisler, Tom Jaeger, Greg LaPlante, Kenneth Young, William Griggs, Tim Mertens and  Patrick J. Foley (Rocko's Modern Life)
Chris Rabideau, Sam Horta, Mark R. Crookston, Julie Gustafson, Stephen Janisz, Timothy J. Garrity and Thomas Syslo (Garfield and Friends)
Peter Collier and Michele Douglas (The Addams Family)
Greg LaPlante, Kenneth Young, Timothy J. Garrity, Michael Geisler, Chris Rabideau, John O. Robinson III, Brian F. Mars, Timothy Borquez, Patrick J. Foley, Tom Jaeger and Dominick Certo (The Little Mermaid)

Outstanding Music Direction and Composition
Richard Stone and Steven Bernstein (Animaniacs)
Richard S. Kaufman, Mark Watters, Albert Lloyd Olson, James Stemple and Eddie Arkin (The Pink Panther)
Sarah Durkee, Stephen Lawrence, Jeff Moss, Robby Merkin, Christopher Cerf, Paul Jacobs, Tony Geiss and Dave Conner (Sesame Street)
Mark Watters (The Little Mermaid)
Mark Koval (Bobby's World)

Outstanding Original Song
Richard Stone - (Music), and Tom Ruegger - (Lyrics) For the song "Animaniacs Main Title Theme" (Animaniacs)
Dominic Messinger - (Lyrics), and Michael Licari - (composer) (Guiding Light)
Gloria Sklerov (lyricist/composer), Harry Lloyd (lyricist/composer) (As the World Turns)
Billie Hughes (composer), and Roxanne Seeman (lyrics) (Another World) 
Ken Corday (composer), and Tom Langan (lyricist/composer) For the song "Don't Make Me Too Young". (Days of Our Lives)

Outstanding Makeup
Ron Wild, Karen Stephens (Adventures in Wonderland) 
Karen Borgo-Santo (Maury)
Reggie Wells (The Oprah Winfrey Show)

Outstanding Animated Program
Howard E. Baker, Norton Virgien, Charles Swenson, Paul Germain, Mary Harrington, Gabor Csupo, Jim Duffy, Geraldine Clarke, Vanessa Coffey, and Arlene Klasky (Rugrats)
Andy Heyward, Michael E. Uslan, Michael Maliani, Sean Roche, Benjamin Melniker, and Robby London (Where on Earth Is Carmen Sandiego?)
Mario Piluso, Mark Young, and David Kirschner (The Halloween Tree)
Alan Burnett, Tom Ruegger, Jean MacCurdy, Frank Paur, Dan Riba, Bruce W. Timm, and Eric Radomski (Batman: The Animated Series)
Steven Spielberg, Sherri Stoner, Rich Arons, Tom Ruegger, Michael Gerard, Alfred Gimeno, Bob Kline, Jenny Lerew, Rusty Mills, Audu Paden, Greg Reyna, Lenord Robinson, Barry Caldwell (Animaniacs)

Lifetime achievement award
 Dick Clark'''

References

External links
 

021
Daytime Emmy Awards